Rod Douglas (born 20 October 1964) is an English boxer.

Boxing career
Born in London, Douglas competed at the 1984 Summer Olympics in Los Angeles, where he reached the quarter finals.

He represented England and won a gold medal in the 75 kg middleweight division, at the 1986 Commonwealth Games in Edinburgh, Scotland.

Douglas boxed for the St. Georges ABC and Broad Street ABC and won the ABA middleweight championship in 1987 and was three times light-middleweight ABA champion from 1983 to 1985.

References

External links

1964 births
Living people
Boxers from Greater London
English male boxers
Olympic boxers of Great Britain
Boxers at the 1984 Summer Olympics
Boxers at the 1986 Commonwealth Games
Commonwealth Games gold medallists for England
Commonwealth Games medallists in boxing
England Boxing champions
Middleweight boxers
Medallists at the 1986 Commonwealth Games